Colin Heywood, also known as Daniel James, is a singer, actor and television presenter. He competed in A Song For Europe 1986 with "No Easy Way to Love" to represent the United Kingdom in the 1986 Eurovision Song Contest, but lost to Ryder with "Runner in the Night". He appeared in the 1987 horror film Bloody New Year, hosted "But First This" and was, under the alias of "Daniel James", one half of Yell!. Daniel has recently appeared in an Age U.K. advertisement.

Daniel recently released a podcast for the Stock Aitken Waterman Show, where he talks about music and being part of Yell!, his first meeting with Mike Stock and Matt Aitken and releasing Safety In Numbers, as well as being signed by Simon Cowell.

References

20th-century English singers
English male film actors
English male singers
English television presenters
Year of birth missing (living people)
Living people